I Didn't See It Coming is the only album by punk rock band the Professionals to be released in the band's lifetime. It was first released  by Virgin Records on November 1981. On June 14, 2001, Virgin/EMI released a CD edition of the album, appending six tracks previously released as singles and two songs recorded for the mooted The Professionals album.

Track listing

Original LP (1981)

2001 CD Edition

Personnel
The Professionals
Steve Jones − lead vocals, lead guitar
Paul Cook − drums, backing vocals
Ray McVeigh − rhythm guitar, backing vocals
Paul Myers − bass
Andy Allan - bass, backing vocals on tracks 11,12,13,14,17 and 18
Technical
Bill Smith - sleeve design
Gered Mankowitz - cover photography

References

1981 debut albums
The Professionals (band) albums
Sex Pistols
Virgin Records albums
Albums produced by Nigel Gray